This is a list of airports in Namibia, sorted by location.

List of airports 
Airport names shown in bold indicate the airport has scheduled service on commercial airlines.

See also 
 Transport in Namibia
 List of airports by ICAO code: F#FY – Namibia
 Wikipedia: WikiProject Aviation/Airline destination lists: Africa#Namibia

References

External links 
 Namibia Airports Company
 Great Circle Mapper

Namibia
 
Airports
Airports
Namibia